Věžnice may refer to:

 Věžnice (Jihlava District), a village in the Czech Republic
 Věžnice (Havlíčkův Brod District), a village in the Czech Republic